Christine Ay Tjoe (born 27 September 1973) is an Abstract Expressionist painter from Bandung, Indonesia. In 1997, she graduated from the Faculty of Fine Arts and Design of the Bandung Institute of Technology. She started her career as an assistant fashion designer before actively working as an artist. In 2007, she was awarded one of the top five winners of the Philips Morris Indonesia Art Award.

In 2008, she received an award for her performance in the solo role of Interiority of Hope at the Emitant Gallery in Surabaya. In the same year she became an artist residency at STPI Creative Workshop & Gallery in Singapore. In 2009 she was awarded the SCMP Art Futures Prize Winner at the Hong Kong Art Fair, and in 2015 she received the Prudential Eye Award.

Her contemporary paintings have received high appreciation abroad, especially in Asia. In 2017 her painting entitled Small Flies and Other Wings was sold for HK$ 11.7Mio by the Phillips auction house in Hong Kong, which placed her works among the most expensive living Indonesian artists. The painting depicts life and death visualized by a swarm of flies. The prices for paintings of Christine remain high, in 2021 her painting Second Studio from 2013 was sold by Sotheby's for HK$ 7.4Mio in Hong Kong.

External links 

Youtube, 2010: An interview with artist Ay Tjoe Christine
Youtube, 2015: Christine Ay Tjoe interview for the 2015 Prudential Eye Awards
Youtube, 2018: Christine Ay Tjoe - Black, kcalB, Black, kcalB ex - White Cube Bermondsey - London - December 2018
Youtube, 2018: Christine Ay Tjoe on 'Wall Prison' | White Cube

References 

1973 births
Living people
Bandung Institute of Technology alumni
Abstract expressionist artists
Arts in Indonesia
Indonesian women artists
20th-century women artists
Indonesian women painters
20th-century Indonesian painters
21st-century Indonesian painters